This is a list of Academy Award winners and nominees whose career and identification are associated predominantly with Poland. The list is current as of the 94th Academy Awards nominations. There were eight Academy Awards given to Polish filmmakers for their work, including one Honorary Academy Award. The cinematographer Janusz Kamiński is the most awarded Polish filmmaker. The director Roman Polański won an Oscar and was nominated four more times (additionally, Knife in the Water, a film directed and written by him, was also nominated). There were twelve Polish pictures nominated for Best Foreign Language Film.

Academy Honorary Award

Best Actress – Leading Role

Best Art Direction

Best Costume Design

Best Cinematography

Best Director

Best Picture

Best International Feature Film

Best Original Music Score

Best Original Song

Best Live Action Short Film

Best Documentary (Short Subject)

Best Animated Short Film

Best Animated Feature
This list focuses on Polish-born filmmakers.

Best Writing – Adapted Screenplay

Best Writing – Original Screenplay

Technical & Scientifical

Nominations and Winners

See also

 Cinema of Poland

Lists of Academy Award winners and nominees by nationality or region
Academy Awards
Academy Awards
Academy Awards